Scopula concolor is a moth of the family Geometridae. It was described by Warren in 1905. It is endemic to South Africa.

References

Moths described in 1905
concolor
Endemic moths of South Africa
Taxa named by William Warren (entomologist)